Riverside Township, Nebraska may refer to the following places:

Riverside Township, Burt County, Nebraska
Riverside Township, Gage County, Nebraska

See also
Riverside Township (disambiguation)
Riverdale Township, Buffalo County, Nebraska

Nebraska township disambiguation pages